The 1996–97 Ukrainian Hockey Championship was the fourth season and fifth iteration of the Ukrainian Hockey Championship, the top level of ice hockey in Ukraine. Seven teams participated in the league, and HC Sokil Kyiv won the championship.

Regular season

Playoffs
Semifinals
HC Sokil Kyiv 5 - HK ATEK Kyiv 2
Kryzhynka Kyiv 11 - Sdyushor Kharkiv 2
Final
HC Sokil Kyiv 5 - Kryzhynka Kyiv 1
3rd place
HK ATEK Kyiv 6 - Sdyushor Kharkiv 4

External links
1996-97 Standings and results. Ukrainian Ice Hockey Federation

UKHL
Ukrainian Hockey Championship seasons
Ukr